On February 6, 1951, a Pennsylvania Railroad train derailed on a temporary wooden trestle in Woodbridge, New Jersey, killing 85 passengers. It remains New Jersey's deadliest train wreck, the deadliest U.S. derailment since 1918, and the deadliest peacetime rail disaster in the United States.

Description 
Around 5 p.m. on Tuesday, February 6, 1951, Pennsylvania Railroad Train No. 733 left Exchange Place in Jersey City. An express train to Bay Head via the North Jersey Coast Line, No. 733 was crowded that day due to a labor strike on the nearby Jersey Central Railroad. It carried over 1,000 passengers in 11 cars drawn by PRR K4 4-6-2 steam locomotive No. 2445.

That afternoon, rail traffic through Woodbridge was being diverted onto a temporary wooden trestle and a shoofly near Fulton Street, allowing laborers building the New Jersey Turnpike to work on the main line.

Before Train No. 733 left Jersey City, conductor John Bishop reminded engineer Joseph Fitzsimmons about the speed restriction. It was not the railroad's practice to install warning lights in such cases, and Fitzsimmons failed to slow the train as it approached Woodbridge. Bishop, alarmed at the train's speed, tried to pull the emergency cord, but the crush of passengers made it impossible.

The train was traveling faster than  when it reached the curve approaching the trestle, according to a subsequent inquiry. At 5:43 p.m., the tracks shifted under the massive locomotive, and eight of the train's eleven passenger cars derailed. The first two cars fell on their sides. The third and fourth cars crashed into each other as they hurtled down a  embankment. It was in these two cars that most of the 85 deaths occurred. The fifth and sixth cars were left hanging in mid-air over a street that glistened from rain. Some passengers may have jumped to their deaths, believing they would land in water. The accident occurred in a heavily populated area, so help soon arrived. Neighbors opened their houses and businesses to those in need. The critically injured were taken to nearby hospitals.

The report concluded that the wreck was caused by "excessive speed on a curve of a temporary track". Fitzsimmons continued working for the railroad, but never operated a train again.

Near the derailment site, the victims are memorialized by a pair of historical markers, installed by New Jersey Transit in 2002 and by Woodbridge Township in 2013.

In popular culture 
In the prologue to his 1976 novel Slapstick, Kurt Vonnegut references the death of his brother-in-law, James Carmalt Adams, killed in the derailment.

See also

List of American railroad accidents
List of rail accidents (1950–1959)

References

Further reading

External links
Dziobko, John (February 7, 1951). "Pennsylvania Railroad at Woodbridge, New Jersey". Color photo of the scene the day after the accident.
Interstate Commerce Commission (April 19, 1951). "Accident at Woodbridge, N.J.". Report of the accident investigation.

Sesnowich, Mike H. (2009). "The Woodbridge Train Wreck". Includes dozens of documentary photos from the scene.
Wreck of the Broker 70 years later on YouTube

Bridge disasters in the United States
Railway accidents and incidents in New Jersey
Derailments in the United States
Woodbridge Township, New Jersey
Transportation in Middlesex County, New Jersey
Accidents and incidents involving Pennsylvania Railroad
Railway accidents in 1951
1951 in New Jersey
February 1951 events in the United States